Cutral Có Airport  is an airport serving Cutral Có, Neuquén province, Argentina.

Accidents and incidents
All 34 occupants of the aircraft — 31 passengers and a crew of three — died in the accident.

See also

List of airports in Argentina

References

Airports in Argentina